Daryl Cohen (12 July 1935 – 4 March 2016) was an Australian weightlifter. He competed in the men's middleweight event at the 1960 Summer Olympics.

References

External links
 

1935 births
2016 deaths
Australian male weightlifters
Olympic weightlifters of Australia
Weightlifters at the 1960 Summer Olympics
Sportspeople from Melbourne
20th-century Australian people
21st-century Australian people